Petko Dermendzhiev (born 13 February 1936) is a Bulgarian wrestler. He competed in the men's freestyle welterweight at the 1964 Summer Olympics.

References

1936 births
Living people
Bulgarian male sport wrestlers
Olympic wrestlers of Bulgaria
Wrestlers at the 1964 Summer Olympics
Place of birth missing (living people)